Gohar Zaman (born December 15, 1979) is a retired Pakistani footballer, who played as a midfielder for Pakistan Airlines and Allied Bank. He was forced to retire in 2002 due to an injury.

Zaman won National League thrice with Allied Bank, first in 1997 and then two consecutive titles in 1999 and 2000. He also won the National Football Challenge Cup four times with Allied Bank, winning in 1996, 1998, 1999 and 2002. 

During the 2002 World Cup qualifiers he became the only Pakistani footballer to score a hat-trick in a World Cup match. He completed hat-trick within 40 minutes against Sri Lanka in 3-3 draw.

Gohar was the assistant manager of the Pakistan national football team between 2007 and 2008.

Honours
Allied Bank
National Football League: 1997(1), 1999, 2000

Pakistan National Football Challenge Cup: 1996, 1998, 1999, 2002

External links
Profile at footballpakistan

1979 births
Living people
Pakistani footballers
Pakistan international footballers
Footballers at the 2002 Asian Games
Association football midfielders
Asian Games competitors for Pakistan